Danville Community College (DCC) is one of the twenty-three two-year colleges in the Virginia Community College System (VCCS). It is located in Danville, Virginia. Unlike many of the other VCCS schools, it predates the formation of a statewide body for junior colleges. Its roots began in 1936 as Danville Textile School. In addition, a branch campus of Virginia Tech located in Danville was folded into the college in 1968. Danville Community College also has a baseball team, which won the Virginia Community College System state baseball championships in 2006 and 2007.

Danville Community College is an  institution of higher education serving the City of Danville, Pittsylvania County and Halifax County. The main campus is located on South Main Street in Danville, consisting of 11 college buildings.

Beginning as early as 1890, the campus of Danville Military Institute (1890 to 1939) housed prisoners of war during World War II (1944–1945), was home to the off-campus engineering division of Virginia Polytechnic Institute (named VPI Extension - fall 1946 to 1950, Danville Branch of VPI - 1950 to 1965, and Danville Division of VPI - 1965 to 1968), and shared the campus with Danville Technical Institute (formerly Danville Textile School) from 1945 to 1966, until DTI merged with the Danville Division of VPI to form Danville Community College.

Danville Community College is governed by an advisory board of nine members. The college is supervised by the Virginia Community College System (VCCS) and State Board for Community Colleges, and is accredited by the Southern Association of Colleges and Schools (1866 Southern Lane, Decatur, Georgia 30033-4097) to award associate degrees to those students successfully completing a curriculum.

Extra-curricular offerings

Athletics

 DCC Knights baseball (established 2001; they are 2002, 2006, and 2007 Virginia Community College champions) (Discontinued)
 DCC Knights men's and women's basketball (established 2004; cancelled)
 DCC Knights soccer (established 2008; cancelled)
 DCC Knights Women's volleyball (established 2015)

Clubs and organizations
Afro-American Culture Club
Alpha Beta Gamma - International Business Honor Society 
Better Earth & Animal Treatment Society (BEATS)
College Entrepreneurs’ Organization (CEO)
Christian Student Fellowship
DCC CyberKnights (Cyber Security/Networking)
DCC Gospel Choir
DCC Graphics Club
DCC Knights Cheerleaders
Honors Program
International Association of Administrative Professionals (IAAP)
American Criminal Justice Association- (Justice Club)
National Technical Honors Society (NTHS)
Phi Theta Kappa (PTK)
Sigma Kappa Delta (International English Honor Society)
Student Government Association (SGA)

References

External links

Virginia Community College System
Education in Danville, Virginia
Educational institutions established in 1936
Universities and colleges accredited by the Southern Association of Colleges and Schools
Buildings and structures in Danville, Virginia
1936 establishments in Virginia
NJCAA athletics